Quickfire: 10-Minute Kitchen Wonders is a Philippine television cooking show television program broadcast by Q and GMA News TV. Hosted by Rosebud Benitez, it premiered on May 5, 2008. The show concluded on June 29, 2012.

Overview

It showcases recipes by its host, celebrity chef Rosebud Benitez.  Occasionally, the program adopts a theme per season (e.g. "Seafood Festival Season", "Market Tour Season", etc.) and also features Filipino celebrities as guests.

In 2009, the GMA Network-owned GMA Records launched a series of DVD compilations of Quickfire highlight episodes.

References

2008 Philippine television series debuts
2012 Philippine television series endings
Filipino-language television shows
English-language television shows
GMA News TV original programming
Philippine cooking television series
Q (TV network) original programming